Częstochowa railway station is one of two major railway stations in Częstochowa, Silesian Voivodeship, Poland, the other station being Częstochowa Stradom. Since 2015 it has been operating as a “P” (premium) category station in the PKP classification. In 2018, the station served approximately 10,000 passengers a day.

History 

The first station was built in the years 1845–1846, during the construction of the Warsaw-Vienna railway. In 1873 the station was enlarged and then extended by architect Czesław Domaniewski. The original building was torn down in the 1970s to make place for a larger complex.

Work on the current postmodern architectural style station building designed by architect Ryszard Frankowicz, began in 1989. The first stage consisting of an overpass connecting the station platforms was opened in 1991, in time for the 6th World Youth Day whose central events took place in the Jasna Góra Monastery in Częstochowa. Construction of the stations main building started in 1994 and on November 9, 1996, on the 150th anniversary of the railroad reaching Częstochowa the entire complex was finished. It was officially opened by the then President of Poland, Aleksander Kwaśniewski. On May 24, 1997, a monument with the bust of Władysław Biegański was unveiled in front of the station.

According to the Gazeta Wyborcza ranking of 2008, Częstochowa railway station was considered the third most beautiful station in Poland, behind Białystok railway station and Lublin railway station.

Train services
The station is served by the following service(s):

Intercity services (IC) Warszawa - Częstochowa - Opole - Wrocław 
Intercity services (IC) Białystok - Warszawa - Częstochowa - Opole - Wrocław
Intercity services (IC) Gdynia - Gdańsk - Bydgoszcz - Toruń - Kutno - Łódź - Częstochowa - Katowice - Bielsko-Biała
 Intercity services (IC) Łódź Fabryczna — Częstochowa — Kraków Główny
Intercity services (IC) Warszawa - Częstochowa - Katowice - Bielsko-Biała
Intercity services (IC) Białystok - Warszawa - Częstochowa - Katowice - Bielsko-Biała
Intercity services (IC) Olsztyn - Warszawa - Skierniewice - Częstochowa - Katowice - Bielsko-Biała
Intercity services (IC) Olsztyn - Warszawa - Skierniewice - Częstochowa - Katowice - Gliwice - Racibórz
Intercity services (TLK) Warszawa - Częstochowa - Lubliniec - Opole - Wrocław - Szklarska Poręba Górna
Intercity services (TLK) Warszawa - Częstochowa - Katowice - Opole - Wrocław - Szklarska Poręba Górna
Intercity services (TLK) Gdynia Główna — (via Częstochowa) — Zakopane 
Regional services (PR) Radomsko - Częstochowa
Regional services (PR) Piotrków Trybunalski - Radomsko - Częstochowa
 Regional services (PR) Łódź Fabryczna - Piotrków Trybunalski - Radomsko - Częstochowa 
 Regional services (PR) Łódź Kaliska - Piotrków Trybunalski - Radomsko - Częstochowa 
Regional Service (PR) Częstochowa - Lubliniec
Regional Service (PR) Częstochowa – Lubliniec - Kluckzbork - Namysłów
 Regional services (PR) Częstochowa - Włoszczowa
 Regional services (PR) Częstochowa - Włoszczowa - Kielce
 Regional services (PR) Częstochowa - Włoszczowa - Kielce - Busko-Zdrój

Regional Service (KŚ)  Gliwice – Zabrze - Katowice – Zawiercie - Częstochowa
Regional Service (KŚ)  Częstochowa – Lubliniec
Regional services (KŚ)  Tychy Lodowisko - Katowice - Sosnowiec Główny - Dąbrowa Górnicza Ząbkowice - Zawiercie

References

External links
 

Railway stations in Poland opened in 1846
Buildings and structures in Częstochowa
Railway stations in Silesian Voivodeship
Railway stations served by Przewozy Regionalne InterRegio